The 2018 United States House of Representatives elections in Tennessee was held on November 6, 2018, to elect the nine U.S. representatives from the state of Tennessee, one from each of the state's nine congressional districts. The elections coincided with the elections of other federal and state offices, including the gubernatorial election.

Following the 2018 elections, no seats changed hands, leaving the Tennessee delegation at a 7-2 Republican majority.

Overview

By district

Results of the 2018 United States House of Representatives elections in Tennessee by district:

District 1

The 1st district covers the northeastern corner of the states and is anchored by the Tri-Cities area including the cities of Greeneville, Johnson City, and Kingsport. This is a heavily Republican district with a PVI of R+28 as of 2018. The incumbent is Republican Phil Roe, who has represented the district since 2009.  Roe was re-elected with 78% of the vote in 2016 and re-elected in 2018.

Roe had initially promised to serve only five terms when first elected back in 2008, but announced in February 2018 that he would run again that November.

Republican primary

Results

Democratic primary

Results

General election

Results

District 2

The 2nd district is located in northeastern Tennessee and is centered around Knoxville and its surrounding suburbs; other cities include Jefferson City and Tazewell. As of 2018, this district has a PVI of R+20. The incumbent is Republican John Duncan, who has represented the district since 1988. Duncan was re-elected with 76% of the vote in 2016.

On July 31, 2017, Duncan announced that he would not run for re-election in 2018. He wishes to instead spend more time with his family. His successor, Tim Burchett is the seventh person (not including caretakers) to represent this district since 1909.

In the general election, Republican Tim Burchett won against his Democratic challenger Renee Hoyos.

Republican primary

Candidates
Declared
 Tim Burchett, Knox County Mayor
 Jason Emert
 Hank Hamblin
 Jimmy Matlock, State Representative
 Sarah Ashley Nickloes
 Vito Sagliano
 C. David Stransberry

Endorsements

Results

Democratic primary

Candidates
Declared
 Renee Hoyos, executive director of the Tennessee Clean Water Network
 Joseph Schenkenfelder
 Joshua Williams

Results

Independents
Declared
 Greg Samples (Libertarian)
 Marc Whitmire

Notes

General election

Results

District 3

The 3rd district is located in eastern Tennessee and is anchored by Chattanooga; other cities include LaFollette and Oak Ridge. As of 2018, this district has a PVI of R+18. The incumbent is Republican Chuck Fleischmann, who has represented the district since 2011.  Fleischmann was re-elected with 66% of the vote in 2016 and re-elected in 2018.

Republican primary

Results

Democratic primary

Results

General election

Results

District 4

The 4th district is anchored by Murfreesboro in southern Tennessee; other cities include Cleveland and Mount Pleasant. As of 2018, this district has a PVI of R+20. The incumbent is Republican Scott DesJarlais, who has represented the district since 2011.  DesJarlais was re-elected with 65% of the vote in 2016 and re-elected in 2018.

Republican primary

Results

Democratic primary

Results

General election

Results

District 5

The 5th district is centered around the state capital, Nashville, and the surrounding suburbs including the cities of Ashland City and Dickson. As of 2018, this district had a PVI of D+7. The incumbent is Democrat Jim Cooper, who has represented the district since 2003 and previously represented the 4th district from 1983 until 1995.  Cooper was re-elected with 63% of the vote in 2016 and re-elected in 2018.

Republican primary

Results

Democratic primary

Results

General election

Results

District 6

The 6th district is located in middle Tennessee including Cookeville, Gallatin, Hendersonville, and Lebanon. As of 2018, This district has a PVI of R+24. The incumbent is Republican Diane Black, who had represented the district since 2011.  Black was re-elected with 71% of the vote in 2016.

Black unsuccessfully ran for governor instead of re-election in 2018.

In the general election, Republican John Rose won again his Democratic challenger Dawn Barlow.

Republican primary

Candidates
Declared
 Bob Corlew, former State judge
 Judd Matheny, former State representative
 Christopher Monday
 John Rose, former Tennessee Commissioner of Agriculture 
 Lavern Vivio

Endorsements

Results

Democratic primary

Candidates
Declared
 Dawn Barlow
 Christopher Finley
 Peter Heffernan
 Merrilee Wineinger

Results

Independents
Declared
 Lloyd Dunn
 David Ross (Libertarian)

Notes

General election

Results

District 7

The 7th district is centered around the Nashville metropolitan area including the Nashville suburbs such as Brentwood and Franklin; other cities include Clarksville and Lawrenceburg. As of 2018, this district has a PVI of R+20. The incumbent is Republican Marsha Blackburn, who has represented the district since 2003. She was re-elected with 72% of the vote in 2016.

Blackburn was expected to run for re-election until Senator Bob Corker announced he would retire. After Corker's announcement, she announced on October 5, 2017 she would run for Corker's seat in the U.S. Senate.

In the general election, Republican Mark Green won against his Democratic challenger Justin Kanew.

Republican primary

Candidates
Declared
 Mark Green, State Senator

Results

Democratic primary

Candidates
Declared
 Justin Kanew, former contestant on The Amazing Race 15 and The Amazing Race 18
 Matt Reel, U.S. army special forces member and former Democratic staffer

Results

General election

Results

District 8 

The 8th district is located in western Tennessee, including the cities of Jackson, Paris and Union City, and the Memphis suburbs, such as Bartlett and Germantown. As of 2018, this district has a PVI of R+19. The incumbent is Republican David Kustoff, who has represented the district since 2017.  Kustoff was elected with 69% of the vote in 2016 and re-elected in 2020.

Republican primary

Results

Democratic primary

Results

General election

Results

District 9

The 9th district is based around Memphis and its surrounding suburbs including Millington. This is a heavily Democratic district with a PVI of D+28 as of 2018. The incumbent is Democrat Steve Cohen, who has represented the district since 2007. Cohen was re-elected with 79% of the vote in 2016 and re-elected in 2018.

Republican primary

Results

Democratic primary

Results

General election

Results

See also
 United States House of Representatives elections, 2018
 United States elections, 2018

References

External links
Candidates at Vote Smart 
Candidates at Ballotpedia 
Campaign finance at FEC 
Campaign finance at OpenSecrets

Official campaign websites of first district candidates
Paul Krane (I) for Congress
Marty Olsen (D) for Congress
Phil Roe (R) for Congress

Official campaign websites of second district candidates
Tim Burchett (R) for Congress
Renee Hoyos (D) for Congress
Greg Samples (L) for Congress
Marc Whitmire (I) for Congress

Official campaign websites of third district candidates
Chuck Fleischmann (R) for Congress
Danielle Mitchell (D) for Congress

Official campaign websites of fourth district candidates
Scott DesJarlais (R) for Congress
Mariah Phillips (D) for Congress

Official campaign websites of fifth district candidates
Jody Ball (R) for Congress
Jim Cooper (D) for Congress

Official campaign websites of sixth district candidates
Dawn Barlow (D) for Congress
Lloyd Dunn (I) for Congress
John Rose (R) for Congress
David Ross (L) for Congress

Official campaign websites of seventh district candidates
Mark Green (R) for Congress
Justin Kanew (D) for Congress

Official campaign websites of eighth district candidates
David Kustoff (R) for Congress
Erika Stotts Pearson (D) for Congress

Official campaign websites of ninth district candidates
Charlotte Bergmann (R) for Congress
Steve Cohen (D) for Congress

2018
Tennessee
United States House of Representatives